Offspeed and In There is the second album by the American band Drain, released in 1996 through Trance Syndicate.

Critical reception
Spin named the album one of "The 10 Best Albums You Didn't Hear in '96", writing that King Coffey mixes "snatches of sitar, Sadie, bird calls, the Boredoms, cockpit jabber, and himself goofing around on Middle Eastern stringed instruments." The Dallas Observer listed the album as one of the 10 best Texas albums of 1996.

Track listing

Personnel 
King Coffey – drums, keyboards, vocals, production
David McCreath – guitar, vocals, design
Owen McMahon – bass guitar, vocals

References 

1996 albums
Drain (band) albums
Trance Syndicate albums